P. cinnamomea may refer to:
 Phragmataecia cinnamomea, a moth species found in Taiwan and southern China
 Pouteria cinnamomea, a plant species endemic to Peru

See also 
 Cinnamomea (disambiguation)